Raja Mariyadhai is a 1987 Indian Tamil-language drama film directed by Karthick Raghunath. The film stars Sivaji Ganesan, Karthik and Jeevitha. It is a remake of the Telugu film Simham Navvindi.

Plot
Rajasekar is an industrialist who has strict expectations of his employees and those around him. Raghuram works for Rajasekar and is a stool pigeon, constantly ratting out fellow employees to improve his own standing in his boss' eyes. He also hides his relationship with his girlfriend Vaidehi as Rajasekar is against love and expects Raghuram to remain a bachelor. Vaidehi, fed up with waiting, insists on marriage. The two marry in secret and after lying to Rajasekar, go to Ooty for their honeymoon. Confusion arises when Rajasekar also lands in Ooty, meets Vaidehi and starts to see her as a surrogate daughter.

Cast
Sivaji Ganesan as Rajasekar
Karthik as Raghuram
Jeevitha as Vaithehi
Kallapetti Singaram as Ramanathan
Janagaraj as Hanumanthu
Senthil as Watchman
Charuhasan as Shankar
Oru Viral Krishna Rao as Head Clerk
Sadhana as Meena
Disco Shanti as Disco Shanthi
Anuradha as Anuradha 
I. S. R
Rowdy Rathinam
Baby Sonia
Baby Neena

Soundtrack 
The soundtrack was composed by Shankar–Ganesh and the lyrics were by Vairamuthu.
"Chinnanjiru Annam Ondru" - Malaysia Vasudevan
"Pada Pada Pada Ena Paranthathu Paravai" - S. P. Balasubrahmanyam, S. P. Sailaja
"Vannakkiliye Vadi Veliye" - K. J. Yesudas, Chitra
"Naanthaane Disco Shanthi" - Vani Jairam, S. P. Sailaja

Reception

References

1987 films
1980s Tamil-language films
Films scored by Shankar–Ganesh
Indian comedy-drama films
Tamil remakes of Telugu films